Gaia Earth Sciences Limited is a privately owned petrophysics consulting company based in the United Kingdom offering services to the international upstream oil & gas industry.
It is a sustaining member of the Petroleum Exploration Society of Great Britain and a sponsor of the London Petrophysical society  and the Aberdeen Formation Evaluation Society.

History 

The company was founded in 2003 by Stuart Huyton and now operates in over fifty countries worldwide with a group of twenty-five consultants.

The headquarters are in North East Scotland near to the village of Cummingston.

Services 
 Wireline log QA/QC is the process by which the quality of acquisition and data is controlled during Wireline (cabling) logging operations in oil wells and gas wells.
 Formation evaluation is the method by which the data acquired during wireline logging are processed and evaluated to produce results which allow an estimation of oil or gas in place, amongst other things.

Awards
In 2012, Gaia Earth Sciences was awarded the Queen's Award for Enterprise in International Trade.  This is the United Kingdom's most prestigious award for business performance.

References

External links
 Gaia Earth Sciences website

Companies based in Moray
Oilfield services companies
Technology companies of the United Kingdom
British companies established in 2003
2003 establishments in Scotland
Technology companies established in 2003
Energy companies established in 2003
Consulting firms established in 2003